The 1986 Alberta general election was held on May 8, 1986, to elect members of the Legislative Assembly of Alberta.

Peter Lougheed, who had created the modern Alberta Progressive Conservatives, led it to power in 1971, and served as premier of Alberta for fourteen years, retired from politics in 1985. The PC Party elected Don Getty as its new leader.

Getty was not able to gain the confidence of Albertans as Lougheed had, and the party's popular vote fell by ten percentage points. The PCs were still, however, able to win a fifth term in government, with over half the votes in the province, and 61 of the 83 seats in the legislature. While the PC's continued to dominate in Calgary and rural Alberta, unlike previous PC victories the party was badly routed in the provincial capital Edmonton where it won only four seats.

The New Democratic Party, now led by Ray Martin, was able to make itself the focus of opposition to the PC government, winning almost 30% of the vote, and sixteen seats in the legislature (up from two in the 1982 election), mostly in Edmonton where they became the dominant political party. This was a salutary result after the tragic death of its leader, Grant Notley, in 1984. It would again take 16 seats in the next election. These two elections were the NDP's best result in any election until it won government in the 2015 election.

The Liberal Party of Nicholas Taylor returned to the legislature for the first time since 1969 with four seats. Two seats were won by former Social Credit members who had formed the Representative Party of Alberta after winning re-election in 1982 as independents.

Western Canada Concept, a western separatist party that had won almost 12% of the vote in 1982, collapsed under the leadership of Jack Ramsay, who later served as a Reform Party of Canada Member of Parliament.

The Social Credit Party of Alberta nominated no candidates. The party had governed Alberta for 36 years before getting bounced out of power by the Tories in 1971.

The 22-member opposition in the Alberta Legislature was the largest since 1971. Although the opposition MLAs were still outnumbered three to one by Conservative MLAs, they presented a significant competitive voice to the dominant Conservative Party. The NDP, long the most able, visible and popular opposition group in the Legislature now were granted status of Official Opposition.  The existence of the moderately large opposition is counter to the pattern of Alberta both before and after  of having minuscule opposition in the Legislature, one party dominance for a long period followed by landslide in favour of a new party.

Thus the 1986 Legislature was part of a break, short lived as it happened, in the usual pattern of Alberta politics that some describe as ideologically conservative, anachronistic, odd and unpredictable. It was thought by some that Alberta politics was beginning to resemble that of Canada's other provinces.

UofA prof Allan Tupper said the rise of a new, competent opposition was a healthy development in Alberta's politics and would likely contribute positively to Alberta's economic and social well-being.

However, in 1993, the NDP caucus was obliterated, and the Liberal became the Official Opposition. And Conservatives received 61 percent of the seats (although with only 45 percent of the votes) and thus still held overwhelming dominance in the Legislature, with a three to two ratio of seats over the opposition.

Results
Overall voter turnout was 47.25%.

Note:

* Party did not nominate candidates in the previous election.

Results by riding

|-
|Athabasca-Lac La Biche
|
|Bill Kostiw3,09835.97%|||
|Leo Piquette3,37239.15%
|
|Don J. Corse1,94222.55%
|
|
|
|Peter Mihailuk (WCC)1842.14%|||
|
|-
|Banff-Cochrane|||
|Greg Stevens4,53665.83%
|
|Ed Fisher1,45221.07%
|
|
|
|Betty Ann Stimson4366.33%
|
|Bill Deacon (Ind.)4446.44%|||
|Greg Stevens
|-
|Barrhead|||
|Kenneth R. Kowalski5,09257.74%
|
|Larry E. McConnell2,30326.11%
|
|Mary Lou Ehrenholz6377.22%
|
|Ferne Nutt2352.66%
|
|Herb Brent (Ind.)5396.11%|||
|Kenneth R. Kowalski
|-
|Bonnyville|||
|Ernie Isley3,63065.24%
|
|Thomas J. Tucker1,66329.89%
|
|
|
|
|
|Vern McCaig (WCC)2564.60%|||
|Ernie Isley
|-
|Bow Valley|||
|Tom N. Musgrove3,39557.82%
|
|Vanore Voaklander2053.49%
|
|Horace Andrew Olson1,04617.81%
|
|Martha Andrews1,22020.78%
|
||||
|Tom N. Musgrove
|-
|Calgary-Bow|||
|Neil Webber5,39255.84%
|
|Scott Jeffrey3,33634.54%
|
|Annyteh K. Pezuolla6116.33%
|
|
|
|Douglas Attfield (Her.)2692.80%
||
|Neil Webber
|-
|Calgary-Buffalo
|
|Brian Craig Lee3,43734.54%
|
|George Chatsis1,08910.94%|||
|Sheldon Chumir5,24252.68%
|
|Colin Svendsen1531.54%
|
||||
|Brian Craig Lee
|-
|Calgary-Currie|||
|Dennis L. Anderson5,48359.52%
|
|Glenn Miller1,65417.95%
|
|Rork Hilford1,84220.00%
|
|
|
|Peter Grizans (Ind.)2192.38%|||
|Dennis L. Anderson
|-
|Calgary-Egmont|||
|David John Carter5,78166.90%
|
|Tom Chesterman1,74020.14%
|
|Bernie C. Tanner1,10212.75%
|
|
|
||||
|David John Carter
|-
|Calgary-Elbow|||
|David J. Russell4,51565.16%
|
|Susan C. Liddy1,11916.15%
|
|Frank Wishlow1,26818.30%
|
|
|
||||
|David J. Russell
|-
|Calgary-Fish Creek|||
|William Edward Payne7,85269.41%
|
|Kerin Spaargaren1,88216.64%
|
|Lea Russell1,55313.73%
|
|
|
||||
|William Edward Payne
|-
|Calgary-Foothills|||
|Janet Koper6,11155.29%
|
|Thora Miessner2,57223.27%
|
|Len Wolstenholme1,74115.75%
|
|J. Allen Howard6235.64%
|
||||
|Janet Koper
|-
|Calgary-Forest Lawn
|
|Moe Amiri2,41034.55%|||
|Barry Pashak2,49235.73%
|
|Gene Czaprowski1,11115.93%
|
|Douglas Williams2373.40%
|
|Mikey Graham (Ind.)2713.90%Gerald K. Lee (Ind.)2243.22%
Independent	Dorothy Bohdan (Ind.)1091.57%IndependentJim Othen (Ind.)670.96%Bruce Potter (Comm.)280.40%
||
|John Zaozirny
|-
|Calgary-Glenmore|||
|Dianne Mirosh5,71860.18%
|
|Kelly Hegg1,33714.07%
|
|Lois Cummings2,03321.40%
|
|
|
|Larry R Heather (Ind.)3844.04%|||
|Hugh L. Planche
|-
|Calgary-McCall|||
|Stanley Kenneth Nelson5,41862.99%
|
|Ken Richmond2,43528.31%
|
|John J. Gleason7308.49%
|
|
|
||||
|Stanley Kenneth Nelson
|-
|Calgary-McKnight|||
|Eric Charles Musgreave4,82355.01%
|
|Sandra Botting2,61029.77%
|
|Carol Reimer1,30714.91%
|
|
|
||||
|Eric Charles Musgreave
|-
|Calgary-Millican|||
|Gordon Wells Shrake3,20447.92%
|
|David Davis Swan2,51237.57%
|
|James Jude Smith5888.79%
|
|Barry M. Bernard1482.21%
|
|Dave Wereschuk (Ind.)2093.13%|||
|Gordon Wells Shrake
|-
|Calgary-Montrose|||
|Rick Orman4,39559.63%
|
|Frank Gereau2,03527.61%
|
|Roly Thomas7109.63%
|
|Adrian C. Janssens2182.96%
|
||||
|
|-
|Calgary-Mountain View
|
|Jim Prentice5,26743.39%|||
|Robert Andrew Hawkesworth5,52445.51%
|
|Doug Rae1,1399.38%
|
|
|
|Tom Erhart (Ind.)1721.42%|||
|Bohdan Zip
|-
|Calgary-North Hill|||
|Frederick Alan Stewart5,54554.26%
|
|Noel Jantzie2,94028.77%
|
|Pauline Kay1,18911.64%
|
|Tom Gorman5115.00%
|
||||
|Ed Oman
|-
|Calgary-North West|||
|Stan Cassin7,77562.40%
|
|Tom Schepens3,37627.09%
|
|Dean Biollo1,28410.30%
|
|
|
||||
|Sheila Embury
|-
|Calgary-Shaw|||
|Jim Dinning6,69461.38%
|
|Len Curle1,16610.69%
|
|Brendan Dunphy2,72725.01%
|
|Byron L. Chenger2952.71%
|
||||
|
|-
|Calgary-West|||
|Elaine McCoy6,84664.33%
|
|Joseph Yanchula2,35422.12%
|
|George Francom1,39013.06%
|
|
|
||||
|Peter Lougheed
|-
|Camrose|||
|Ken Rostad5,31254.91%
|
|Gordon Ekelund2,26923.45%
|
|Ralph Tate7587.84%
|
|J.A. (Jim) Watson6977.20%
|
|Jack Ramsay (WCC)6346.55%|||
|Gordon Stromberg
|-
|Cardston|||
|Jack Ady2,67960.08%
|
|Cynthia Cunningham3898.72%
|
|
|
|
|
|Steve Pinchak (Ind.)1,37630.86%|||
|John Thompson
|-
|Chinook|||
|Henry Kroeger3,79679.35%
|
|Lavera Gladys Creasy95920.05%
|
|
|
|
|
||||
|Henry Kroeger
|-
|Clover Bar
|
|Muriel Abdurahman2,81127.71%
|
|Ken Robinson2,08520.55%
|
|Barry Shandro4444.38%|||
|Walt A. Buck4,79547.26%
|
||||
|Walt A. Buck
|-
|Cypress-Redcliff|||
|Alan Hyland2,48252.40%
|
|Lew Toole55811.78%
|
|
|
|Lloyd B. Robinson1,68235.51%
|
||||
|
|-
|Drayton Valley|||
|Shirley Cripps5,33061.00%
|
|Lawrence Dublenko2,27526.04%
|
|Phil J. Gibeau5946.80%
|
|Ron Williams3013.44%
|
|Gordon Reid (WCC)2192.51%|||
|Shirley Cripps
|-
|Drumheller|||
|Stan Schumacher4,90660.97%
|
|Sid Holt1,15414.34%
|
|
|
|Norman A. Stanger1,72921.49%
|
|Peter Hope (Ind.)2443.03%|||
|Lewis (Mickey) Clark
|-
|Dunvegan|||
|Glen Clegg4,14651.05%
|
|Jim Gurnett3,94448.56%
|
|
|
|
|
||||
|
|-
|Edmonton-Avonmore
|
|Horst A. Schmid4,14041.17%|||
|Marie Laing4,23442.10%
|
|Michael Brings1,11711.11%
|
|Karl R. Badke4164.14%
|
|Mike Walker (WCC)1401.39%|||
|Horst A. Schmid
|-
|Edmonton-Belmont
|
|Walter R. Szwender3,16030.19%|||
|Thomas Sigurdson4,49142.91%
|
|Pat Sembaliuk2,48623.75%
|
|Bette Davies1981.89%
|
|Joe Kovacs (Her.)670.64%David Wallis (Comm.)390.37%
||
|Walter R. Szwender
|-
|Edmonton-Beverly
|
|Bill W. Diachuk3,91734.30%|||
|Ed W. Ewasiuk6,69958.66%
|
|Jim Shinkaruk7846.87%
|
|
|
||||
|Bill W. Diachuk
|-
|Edmonton-Calder
|
|Tony Falcone2,91028.82%|||
|Christie Mjolsness5,11450.65%
|
|Al Iafolla1,92519.07%
|
|
|
|Dave Draginda (WCC)1111.10%	Martin Robbert (Comm.)260.26%
||
|Tom Chambers
|-
|Edmonton-Centre
|
|Mary LeMessurier3,81640.21%|||
|William Roberts3,97641.89%
|
|Douglas Haydock1,38414.58%
|
|
|
|Fred Marshall (WCC)1821.92%Leonard Stahl (Ind.)1031.09%|||
|Mary LeMessurier
|-
|Edmonton-Glengarry
|
|Ihor Broda3,72035.26%|||
|John Younie5,37150.91%
|
|Hugh W. Burgess1,19111.29%
|
|Lou Peterson1471.39%
|
|Herb Lang (WCC)990.94%|||
|Rollie Cook
|-
|Edmonton-Glenora|||
|Nancy Betkowski5,19352.33%
|
|Jim Bell2,91829.40%
|
|Colin P. McDonald1,35213.62%
|
|C.A. Douglas Ringrose3123.14%
|
|Alice Elaine Moody (WCC)1331.34%|||
|Lou Hyndman
|-
|Edmonton-Gold Bar
|
|Alois Paul Hiebert4,15028.24%
|
|Randy Morse4,14228.18%|||
|Bettie Hewes6,37843.40%
|
|
|
||||
|Alois Paul Hiebert
|-
|Edmonton-Highlands
|
|David T. King3,50742.37%|||
|Pam Barrett4,15950.25%
|
|Naseer A. Chaudhary4175.04%
|
|Todd R.C. Ross831.00%
|
|Naomi Rankin (Comm.)510.62%Cec Garfin (Her.)300.36%
||
|David T. King
|-
|Edmonton-Jasper Place|||
|Leslie Gordon Young4,35740.01%
|
|Vair Clendenning4,28639.36%
|
|Karen Leibovici1,94717.88%
|
|Michael P. Astle1571.44%
|
|Curtis Long (WCC)1221.12%|||
|Leslie Gordon Young
|-
|Edmonton-Kingsway
|
|Allen Wasnea3,49138.15%|||
|Alex McEachern4,66951.02%
|
|Patrick Reid8969.79%
|
|
|
|Bowden John Zachara (Her.)780.85%
||
|Carl Paproski
|-
|Edmonton-Meadowlark
|
|Gerard Joseph Amerongen4,22236.55%
|
|Muriel Stanley-Venne2,31520.04%|||
|Grant Mitchell4,91342.54%
|
|R. (Bob) Genis-Bell1761.52%
|
|Norm Kyle (WCC)900.78%|||
|Gerard Joseph Amerongen
|-
|Edmonton-Mill Woods
|
|Milt Pahl4,00441.87%|||
|Gerry Gibeault4,10342.90%
|
|Philip Lister8619.00%
|
|Richard Mather4454.65%
|
|Mike Pawlus (Her.)1321.38%
||
|Milt Pahl
|-
|Edmonton-Norwood
|
|Catherine Chichak1,94225.56%|||
|Ray Martin5,27269.38%
|
|David R. Long3594.72%
|
|
|
||||
|Ray Martin
|-
|Edmonton-Parkallen|||
|Neil S. Crawford5,61244.43%
|
|Jim Russell5,31042.04%
|
|Jerry Paschen1,1008.71%
|
|James Carson5934.69%
|
||||
|Neil S. Crawford
|-
|Edmonton-Strathcona
|
|Julian Koziak4,46737.47%|||
|Gordon S.B. Wright6,44354.04%
|
|Peter Schneider7886.61%
|
|Shane Gordon Venner1020.86%
|
|Dexter B. Dombro (WCC)720.60%Robin Boodle (Comm.)260.22%
||
|Julian Koziak
|-
|Edmonton-Whitemud|||
|Donald Ross Getty7,43657.58%
|
|Tony Higgins3,87530.01%
|
|Eric Wolfman1,1358.79%
|
|Bert Beinert3662.83%
|
|Walter Stack (WCC)920.71%|||
|Keith Alexander
|-
|Fort McMurray|||
|Norman A. Weiss4,15248.49%
|
|Ann Dort Maclean3,39139.61%
|
|Shane Davis1,01011.80%
|
|
|
||||
|
|-
|Grande Prairie|||
|Bob Elliott6,23961.43%
|
|Bernie Desrosiers3,09530.47%
|
|
|
|Andy Haugen5575.48%
|
|Roy Housworth (Ind.)2402.36%|||
|Bob Elliott
|-
|Highwood|||
|Harry E. Alger5,33666.32%
|
|William C. McCutcheon1,05413.10%
|
|
|
|Murray Meszaros81110.08%
|
||||
|Harry E. Alger
|-
|Innisfail|||
|Nigel I. Pengelly4,30965.83%
|
|Tony Mazurkewich1,03315.78%
|
|
|
|Raymond C. Reckseidler4116.28%
|
|George Conway-Brown (WCC)4727.21%Jack Lynass (C.O.R.)3034.64%
||
|Nigel I. Pengelly
|-
|Lacombe|||
|Ron A. Moore4,07977.71%
|
|Ken Ling1,15121.93%
|
|
|
|
|
||||
|Ron A. Moore
|-
|Lesser Slave Lake|||
|Larry R. Shaben2,52956.90%
|
|Bert Dube1,89242.56%
|
|
|
|
|
||||
|Larry R. Shaben
|-
|Lethbridge-East|||
|Archibald Dick Johnston4,56751.98%
|
|Sylvia A. Campbell2,18824.90%
|
|John I. Boras2,00922.87%
|
|
|
||||
|Archibald Dick Johnston
|-
|Lethbridge-West|||
|John Gogo3,99948.50%
|
|Ed Webking2,00624.33%
|
|Al Barnhill1,57919.15%
|
|Douglas Pitt5326.45%
|
|Nora Galenzoski (C.O.R.)1061.29%
||
|John Gogo
|-
|Little Bow
|
|Cliff Wright1,80530.25%
|
|Christina Tomaschuk1372.30%
|
|Dean Oseen (C.O.R.)1582.65%Ben Loman651.09%
||
|Raymond Albert Speaker3,79163.54%
|
||||
|Raymond Albert Speaker
|-
|Lloydminster|||
|Doug Cherry3,58069.23%
|
|Gary McCorquodale1,56730.30%
|
|
|
|
|
||||
|James Edgar Miller
|-
|Macleod|||
|LeRoy Fjordbotten4,05465.93%
|
|Laurie Fiedler75912.34%
|
|
|
|Ed Shimek1,30321.19%
|
||||
|LeRoy Fjordbotten
|-
|Medicine Hat|||
|James Horsman7,71765.72%
|
|Stan Chmelyk1,37311.69%
|
|David J. Carter2,62422.35%
|
|
|
||||
|James Horsman
|-
|Olds-Didsbury|||
|Roy Brassard5,20466.36%
|
|Tom Monto82310.49%
|
|
|
|
|
|Elmer Knutson (C.O.R.)1,78522.85%
||
|Stephen Stiles
|-
|Peace River|||
|Al (Boomer) Adair3,77559.81%
|
|Adele Gale Boucher2,05732.59%
|
|
|
|Joseph (Little Joe) Kessler2914.61%
|
|Anna Pidruchney (Ind.)1742.76%|||
|Al (Boomer) Adair
|-
|Pincher Creek-Crowsnest|||
|Frederick Deryl Bradley3,13451.35%
|
|Mike Cooper2,94848.30%
|
|
|
|
|
||||
|Frederick Deryl Bradley
|-
|Ponoka-Rimbey|||
|Halvar C. Jonson3,60161.94%
|
|Pat Byers1,13819.57%
|
|Mel H. Buffalo3496.00%
|
|
|
|Warren Bloomquist (WCC)70112.06%|||
|
|-
|Red Deer-North|||
|Stockwell Day2,80841.48%
|
|Bruce Beck1,27918.89%
|
|Donald Campbell2,37235.04%
|
|Elvin Janzen1532.26%
|
|Brian Flewwelling (Ind.)1462.16%|||
|
|-
|Red Deer-South|||
|John Oldring4,02356.09%
|
|Connie Barnaby1,66723.24%
|
|Lionel Lizee1,45520.29%
|
|
|
||||
|
|-
|Redwater-Andrew|||
|Steve Zarusky3,53946.55%
|
|Denis Bobocel2,76136.31%
|
|Adrianus Kuiper3094.06%
|
|Michael Senych98112.90%
|
||||
|George Topolnisky
|-
|Rocky Mountain House|||
|John Murray Campbell3,84453.19%
|
|Dolly (Martin) Brown1,26617.52%
|
|Bob Paston6228.61%
|
|Lavern J. Ahlstrom1,04214.42%
|
|Art Carritt (C.O.R.)4366.05%
||
|John Murray Campbell
|-
|Sherwood Park|||
|Peter Elzinga6,37756.41%
|
|Ted Paszek3,18328.16%
|
|Steven Lindop1,54113.63%
|
|Ernie Townsend1961.73%
|
||||
|
|-
|Smoky River|||
|Marvin Moore4,79364.68%
|
|Martin Cree1,54620.86%
|
|Colin Nash2723.67%
|
|Conrad LeBlanc77310.43%
|
||||
|Marvin Moore
|-
|St. Albert
|
|Myrna Fyfe4,58040.70%|||
|Bryan Strong4,70041.77%
|
|Thomas Henry Droege7456.62%
|
|William Ernest Jamison1,21510.80%
|
||||
|Myrna Fyfe
|-
|St. Paul|||
|John Drobot3,01847.82%
|
|Martin Naundorf1,42922.64%
|
|George Michaud4637.34%
|
|Roland F. Rocque1,38021.87%
|
||||
|John Drobot
|-
|Stettler|||
|Brian C. Downey3,93857.68%
|
|Fred J. Rappel1,05815.50%
|
|Red Peeples1,50822.09%
|
|
|
|Iris Bourne (WCC)3084.51%|||
|Graham L. Harle
|-
|Stony Plain|||
|Jim Heron4,53543.58%
|
|Rick Hardy3,04629.27%
|
|Ed Wilson1,28512.35%
|
|Ernest Clintberg1,34312.90%
|
|J. Richard Dougherty (WCC)1861.79%|||
|William Frederick Purdy
|-
|Taber-Warner|||
|Robert Bogle4,48366.75%
|
|Jim Renfrow75611.26%
|
|
|
|John Voorhorst1,44221.47%
|
||||
|Robert Bogle
|-
|Three Hills|||
|Connie Osterman5,92483.20%
|
|Vernal Poole1,16916.42%
|
|
|
|
|
||||
|Connie Osterman
|-
|Vegreville
|
|Ron Rudkowsky3,32838.82%|||
|Derek Fox3,90345.53%
|
|John A. Sawiak1742.03%
|
|Allen Antoniuk1,15013.42%
|
||||
|John S. Batiuk
|-
|Vermilion-Viking|||
|Steve West4,22871.36%
|
|Mervin Stephenson1,67128.20%
|
|
|
|
|
||||
|Tom Lysons
|-
|Wainwright|||
|Robert A. (Butch) Fischer4,24468.44%
|
|Willy Kelch1,10617.84%
|
|Joseph A. Vermette3655.89%
|
|
|
|Allen Abrassart (WCC)4757.66%|||
|Robert A. (Butch) Fischer
|-
|West Yellowhead|||
|Ian Reid3,20744.73%
|
|Phil Oakes3,00541.92%
|
|Laurie Switzer74910.45%
|
|
|
|Lorraine Oberg (WCC)1872.61%|||
|
|-
|Westlock-Sturgeon
|
|Lawrence Kluthe4,04934.84%
|
|Bruce Lennon1,99617.17%|||
|Nicholas Taylor4,52338.91%
|
|Tom Carleton9117.84%
|
|Adam Hauch (C.O.R.)780.67%Laurent St. Denis (Comm.)290.25%Stan Pearson (Her.)250.22%
||
|
|-
|Wetaskiwin-Leduc|||
|Donald H. Sparrow5,82355.57%
|
|M. (Dick) Devries3,06129.21%
|
|Kathleen Crone7407.06%
|
|Harold L. Schneider4884.66%
|
|W.L. (Bud) Iverson (WCC)2081.99%John Tolsma (Ind.)1301.24%|||
|Donald H. Sparrow
|-
|Whitecourt|||
|Peter Trynchy4,03854.07%
|
|Richard Davies1,34918.06%
|
|Rick Allen4596.15%
|
|Merv Zadderey1,61121.57%
|
||||
|Peter Trynchy
|-
|}

See also
List of Alberta political parties

References

Further reading
 

1986 elections in Canada
1986
1986 in Alberta
May 1986 events in Canada